Tear of a Doll, previously called "Tears of a Doll" (also known as T.O.D.) is a musical group from Paris, France which started as a hardcore punk band and later blended the speed and energy of that style with more complex structures inherited from the experiments of 1970s progressive rock, 1990s noise rock or math rock and even non-western traditional music. Tear of a Doll also features female vocals sung in various languages (mainly English, but also Japanese, German, French and Hungarian).

Biography

Early history 1988-1992
Tears of a Doll started in Paris, France, in October 1982, as a sequel to Heimat-los (an influential Hardcore punk from the 80s): It was founded by three members of that band. Originally they spelled their name with an "S".
Their name was chosen as opposite of the typical Hardcore punk band names, and also in reference to a style of Hardcore that had originated in Washington, D.C. and that would be later called "emo".

Later history 1992-...
After they lost their original singer (Norbert from Heimat-los) and their second guitarist (Nydeu, ex. Kromozom 4) and got a new drummer (the third one), they took the opportunity to radically change their sound. From then on they created a new repertoire showing obvious influences of Victims Family and NoMeansNo but with a very personal touch. Astrid Orion (female vocalist) joined the band around that time.

The most representative recording of Tear of a Doll is a full-length untitled album recorded in 1996 on which wild hardcore punk songs are interspersed with more experimental songs that some would label avant-garde rock.

Since the end of 1996 guitarist and founding member François L'H. has spent more time expatriated in Asia than in France. During this time the band has been almost inactive, only playing at Trans-Musicales (1997), a festival in Rennes, France and occasionally releasing a few songs on compilations.

Discography

With Norbert on vocals (up to 1992) 
 Ca y est t'es réveillé? cassette (2nd demo tape), 1990
 Various artists "Euro punk domain" LP, Black Hand (Czech Republic), 1991
 Various artists "Don't forget the punks of Bangkok" 12"EP (USA) 1991
 Tears of a Doll" (untilted) EP, Alternativnoise (France), 1992
 Various artists "Art primitif", On a faim (France)

With Astrid Orion on vocals (from 1992 on) 
 La fille aux allumettes cassette, 1993
 Une araignée dans le plafond cassette, 1994
 Tear of a Doll (untilted) CD, Pandemonium & Dodoll (France), 1996
 Various artists La colère Angrrr (France), 1997
 Various artists Bars en trans 97", 1997
 Various artists 5 years of Pandemonium", Pandemonium (France),1998
 Various artists Allez les filles!", Rock Hardi
 "Erase-yer-head No. 9" split EP with Melt Banana, God is My Co-Pilot & Camp Blackfoot, Pandemonium, 1999
 Various artists International Punk Boxset" (10 CD in a metal box), Canada, 2002
 Various artists Une autre vision des choses" (Re)Aktion (France)
 Various artists Hangover heartattack (a tribute to Poison Idea)", Farewell, Network of Friends (Germany) & Ataque Sonoro (Portugal), 2003

French hardcore punk groups
Math rock groups
French noise rock groups
Musical groups from Paris